David Bradbury (born 16 March 1972) is a rugby league footballer who played in the 1990s and 2000s.

Bradbury made over 100 appearances for Leigh between 2001 and 2004.

Bradbury was a Great Britain tourist in 1996, and an Ireland international and played at the 2000 Rugby League World Cup.

References

External links
The Teams: Ireland 
Statistics at orl-heritagetrust.org.uk

1972 births
Living people
Huddersfield Giants players
Ireland national rugby league team players
Leigh Leopards captains
Leigh Leopards players
Oldham R.L.F.C. players
Place of birth missing (living people)
Rugby league locks
Rugby league props
Rugby league second-rows
Salford Red Devils players